Arthur Joseph Fowler (20 November 1911 - 2001) was an English footballer active in the 1930s. He made 28 appearances in The Football League for Gillingham.

References

1911 births
English Football League players
Dartford F.C. players
Swindon Town F.C. players
Gillingham F.C. players
2001 deaths
English footballers
Association football forwards